Galium rubrum (reddish bedstraw or Caglio arrossato) is a plant species in the Rubiaceae. It is known only from mountainous areas on Switzerland and northern Italy (Valle d'Aosta, Piemonte, Lombardia, Trentino-Alto Adige, Veneto, Friuli-Venezia Giulia, Liguria, Emilia-Romagna).

Galium rubrum is an erect to ascending herb with large panicles bearing many small pink or red flowers.

References

External links
Forum Acta Plantarum
Destigianni, Foto di Galium rubrum, Caglio arrossato
Valdaveto, Galium rubrum

rubrum
Flora of Italy
Flora of the Alps
Flora of Switzerland
Plants described in 1753
Taxa named by Carl Linnaeus